Chinna Babu Arigela  (born 24 November 1974), known as Chinna, is an Indian film producer who works primarily in Telugu cinema. He has also dubbed and produced Tamil remakes in Telugu like Ajith Kumar's Asal as Soolam, Vijay Antony's Naan as Nakili, and Prithviraj's Malayalam hit movie Anwar with the same title.

Tripura is his latest production in Telugu, starring Swathi Reddy, Naveen Chandra and directed by Geethanjali director Raaja Kiran.

Filmography
As producer
Anwar (2011)
Soolam (2012)
Nakili (2013)
Tripura (2015)
Gurthunda Seethakalam (2021)
Full Bottle(2022)

References

Living people
1974 births
Telugu film producers
Film producers from Hyderabad, India